The 1984 NCAA Women's Golf Championships were contested at the third annual NCAA-sanctioned golf tournament to determine the individual and team national champions of women's collegiate golf in the United States. Until 1996, the NCAA would hold just one women's golf championship for all programs across Division I, Division II, and Division III.

The tournament was held again at the University of Georgia Golf Course in Athens, Georgia.

Miami (FL) won the team championship, the Hurricanes' first.

Cindy Schreyer, from Georgia, won the individual title.

Individual results

Individual champion
 Cindy Schreyer, Georgia (297, +5)

Team results

 DC = Defending champion
 Debut appearance

References

NCAA Women's Golf Championship
Golf in Georgia (U.S. state)
NCAA Women's Golf Championship
NCAA Women's Golf Championship
NCAA Women's Golf Championship